Ramon Santana is a municipality (municipio) of the San Pedro de Macorís province in the Dominican Republic.

Its original name was Guasa (also spelt Guaza) but, in 1899, was changed to Ramón Santana after the twin brother of Pedro Santana.

Geography
The town is on the right side of the Soco river. The Guasa river, a tributary of the Soco, is close to the town.

History
In 1888, it was made a Puesto Cantonal (a "military post"), similar to the present Municipal district, of the El Seibo province.

In 1938, Ramón Santana was transferred to the San Pedro de Macorís province as a municipality.

References

Populated places in San Pedro de Macorís Province
Municipalities of the Dominican Republic